Elizabeth Mencel (born April 14, 1993), better known by her stage name Rozes (stylized as ROZES or R O Z E S), is an American musician, singer and songwriter from Montgomeryville, Pennsylvania. She is best known for her 2015 collaboration, "Roses", with duo The Chainsmokers. She also featured in Galantis' song "Girls on Boys".

Early years
A native of Montgomeryville, Pennsylvania, Mencel grew up in a gospel-influenced home and first studied piano at age six. Eventually she also became proficient in clarinet, saxophone, guitar, violin, flute, and trumpet.

Mencel first started her musical career at North Penn High School. Soon after, she earned an associate degree from Montgomery County Community College and then transferred to Temple University in Philadelphia.  After one year at Temple, Mencel chose to pursue music as a full-time career and left college.

Career
In October 2014, under her professional moniker Rozes, Mencel was featured on and wrote Just a Gent's "Limelight", which reached #1 on Hype Machine and has over 2 million plays on SoundCloud.

Mencel was featured on The Chainsmokers' 2015 hit, "Roses", which she co-wrote with Andrew Taggart of The Chainsmokers. Released on June 16, 2015, the single peaked at number six on the Billboard Hot 100, as well as number one on Billboard's Hot Dance/Electronic Songs chart for the week of January 9, 2016.

Rozes' debut EP, Burn Wild, was released on February 14, 2016.

In 2017, Rozes signed a deal with Photo Finish Records, where she released singles "Where Would We Be" (with Nicky Romero), "Canyons", and "Famous". Her debut EP under Photo Finish "i don't know where i'm going, but i'm on my way" was released on August 24, 2018.

In 2019, Rozes released her track "Halfway There", which became the official anthem to the 2019 Women's March on NYC via The Women's March Alliance.

Rozes released her 2nd album with Photo Finish Records in 2020 named "Crazy", which features a duet with Mat Kearney.

Discography

Extended plays

Singles

As lead artist

As a featured artist

Promotional singles

References

External links

Living people
1993 births
Musicians from Philadelphia
American women songwriters
21st-century American singers
Singers from Pennsylvania
Songwriters from Pennsylvania
21st-century American women musicians